Vitaly Popov (born August 7, 1992) is a Russian professional ice hockey forward. He is currently playing with HC Vityaz of the Kontinental Hockey League (KHL). He formerly played in the KHL with Severstal Cherepovets, Avtomobilist Yekaterinburg and Amur Khabarovsk.

External links 

1992 births
Living people
Amur Khabarovsk players
Avtomobilist Yekaterinburg players
Russian ice hockey forwards
Severstal Cherepovets players
HC Vityaz players
People from Magnitogorsk
Sportspeople from Chelyabinsk Oblast